is a thoroughbred breeding facility located in Abira on the island of Hokkaido in Japan. The farm was begun in the late 1970s to early 1980s by the late Zenya Yoshida, and is now run jointly by his sons (Katsumi, Haruya, and Teruya Yoshida), known collectively as the Shadai Group. As of 2006, the brothers own 3,000 horses worldwide. The farm houses stallions from Japan and many other countries and racing circuits. The grounds also house a racing museum and tourist park called the Northern Horse Park and the Northern Farm Kuko, a large horse-training and conditioning facility. The most expensive acquisition was War Emblem, which was bought for US$17 million in 2002 to replace Sunday Silence, which died suddenly that year of a heart attack (and whose offspring are most notable among the stable's horses today). War Emblem was a reluctant breeder, siring only 106 registered foals between 2004 and 2011. He did not sire a foal after 2012, and was pensioned and returned to the United States in the fall of 2015 to Old Friends Equine. Other recent acquisitions include 2010 King George VI and Queen Elizabeth Stakes winner Harbinger and 2010 Epsom Derby and Prix de l'Arc de Triomphe winner Workforce.

Current stallions

Bricks and Mortar
Contrail
Daiwa Major
Drefong
Efforia
Epiphaneia
Harbinger
Isla Bonita
Kitasan Black
Kizuna
Lord Kanaloa
Maurice
Mikki Isle
Mind Your Biscuits
New Year's Day
Orfevre
Rey de Oro
Rulership
Salios
Satono Crown
Satono Diamond
Suave Richard

Past stallions

Admire Cozzene
Admire Don
Admire Main
Admire Jupiter
Admire Vega
Agnes Tachyon
Agnes World
Air Jihad
Allez Milord
Bachir 
Baronnet Turf
Battle Line
Belshazzar 
Best Tie Up
Bubble Gum Fellow 
Captain Thule 
Carnegie
Carroll House
Casino Drive
Chichicastenango
Dance in the Dark
Danon Chantilly
Deep Brillante
Deep Impact
Divine Light
Dr Devious
Dream Journey
Dream Well
Duramente
Durandal
Dynamite Daddy
Eishin Flash
El Condor Pasa
End Sweep
Falbrav
French Deputy
Fuji Kiseki
Gallop Dyna
Genuine
Gold Allure
Golden Pheasant
Grass Wonder
Groom Dancer
Heart Lake
Heart's Cry
Hector Protector
Helissio
Jade Robbery
Judge Angelucci
Jungle Pocket
Just A Way
King Kamehameha
Kinshasa no Kiseki
Kurofune
Lassalle
Lincoln
Logotype
Lohengrin
Manhattan Cafe
Meisho Samson
Mejiro McQueen
Mr C B
Music Time
Narita Top Road
Neo Universe
Nichido Arashi
Northern Taste
Novellist
On Fire
Pentire
Reach the Crown
Real Impact
Real Shadai
Red Falx
Rosado
Satono Aladdin
Sakura Bakushin O
Six Sense
Ski Captain
Slew O'Dyna
Smart Falcon
Soccer Boy
Song of Wind
Special Week
Summer Suspicion
Sunday Silence 
Swept Overboard
Symboli Kris S
Tanino Gimlet
Tayasu Tsuyoshi
That's the Plenty
Thrill Show
Timber Country
Tokai Teio
Tony Bin
Turtle Bowl
Twining
Vermillion
Victoire Pisa
Victory
War Emblem
White Muzzle
Workforce
Zenno Rob Roy

Cemetery 
The graves of several past stallions, such as Northern Taste, Sunday Silence, Deep Impact, and King Kamehameha, are located on the hills within the property.

References

External Links 

 Official Website (in Japanese)
  (in Japanese)
  (in Japanese)

Horse farms
Farms in Japan